Xu Yaping (born 1982-01-20 in Anji, Zhejiang) is a Chinese sprint canoer who competed in the late 2000s. She finished ninth in the K-4 500 m event at the 2008 Summer Olympics in Beijing.

References

Sports-Reference.com profile

1982 births
Canoeists at the 2008 Summer Olympics
Living people
Olympic canoeists of China
People from Huzhou
Sportspeople from Zhejiang
Chinese female canoeists